Teleshopping may refer to:

 Home shopping
 Online shopping
 Shopping channel
 Infomercial